Nike Bent (born 1 December 1981) is a Swedish former alpine skier who competed in the 2006 Winter Olympics.

On 18 August 2010, she announced her retirement from alpine skiing following knee injuries.

References

External links
 sports-reference.com

1981 births
Living people
Swedish female alpine skiers
Olympic alpine skiers of Sweden
Alpine skiers at the 2006 Winter Olympics